Mong Yang Township is a township of Kengtong District (Chiang Tung District) in the Shan State of Burma.  The capital town is Mong Yang. Mong Pawk is part of it but is under UWSA control.

References

Townships of Shan State